Lidija Meškaitytė  (1926–1993) was a Lithuanian painter.

See also
List of Lithuanian painters

References
Universal Lithuanian Encyclopedia

1926 births
1993 deaths
20th-century Lithuanian painters